Hengyang Daily, also known as Hengyang Ribao, is a simplified Chinese newspaper published in the People's Republic of China,  it is the organ newspaper of the Hengyang Municipal Committee of the Chinese Communist Party. The newspaper is sponsored by the Hengyang Municipal Party Committee of CCP,  first published on October 16, 1949, and its predecessor was Hengyang News (衡阳新闻).

History
On 8 October 1949, the Chinese Communist Party took over Hengyang, and on 12 October, the Hengyang Military Control Commission (衡阳市军事管制委员会) was established,  which took over China Times (中华时报), a newspaper run by the Central Club of the Kuomintang, and Dasheng Daily (大声日报), an organ of the Hengyang Kuomintang Party Headquarters (国民党党部), and on 16 October, on their basis, the commission launched Hengyang News as the organ of the Hengyang Military Control Commission. 

In February 1959, Hengyang News was renamed as Hengyang Daily.  In 1963, it became the organ newspaper of the Hengyang Municipal Committee of the CCP.

References

Newspapers established in 1949
Newspapers published in China
Chinese-language newspapers (Simplified Chinese)
1949 establishments in China